Brown house snake or brown house-snake may refer to:

 Boaedon capensis
 African house snake (Boaedon fuliginosus, syn. Lamprophis fuliginosus)

Animal common name disambiguation pages